The 2020 Rally Belgium (also known as Renties Ypres Rally Belgium 2020) was a motor racing event for rally cars that was scheduled to hold between 20 to 22 November 2020, but was cancelled due to the COVID-19 pandemic. It was set to mark the fifty-sixth running of Ypres Rally and was planned to be the seventh round of the 2020 World Rally Championship, World Rally Championship-2 and World Rally Championship-3. It was also going to be the final round of the Junior World Rally Championship. The 2020 event was set to be based in Ypres in West Flanders and was scheduled to be contested over twenty-three special stages.

Background

Schedule changes and event inclusion

Following the cancellation of 2020 Rally Japan, the Ypres Rally of Belgium replaced Rally Japan to hold the seventh round of the championship. This would mark the Ypres Rally run as a WRC event for the first time. The country was set to become the thirty-fourth nation to stage a championship round in the WRC. Unfortunately, the rally was eventually announced to be called off due to the COVID-19 pandemic.

Route
The first two days of action would take place in the area around Ypres, while Sunday's final leg would be focused on the iconic Circuit de Spa-Francorchamps in Stavelot, with the rally-closing Power Stage featuring the famous Eau Rouge-Raidillon section of the track. This meant the Sunday's route would run alongside the 2020 World RX of Benelux of the World Rallycross Championship.

Itinerary

All dates and times are BET (UTC+1).

References

External links
  
 2020 Ypres Rally at ewrc-results.com
 The official website of the World Rally Championship

Belgium
Rally
2020
Ypres